Pease Peak is a  mountain summit located in the Alaska Range, in Denali National Park and Preserve, in the U.S. state of Alaska. Dickey forms the eastern buttress of Pittock Pass, whereas Pease forms the western buttress. Although overlooked as a climbing destination, the peak is often seen due to its proximity to the air taxi landing area and the Sheldon Chalet immediately north of the peak. Pease Peak, and its variant name Mount Pease, is based on a mountain climber's name that was published in the late 1940s.

Climate

Based on the Köppen climate classification,  Pease Peak is located in an alpine climate zone with long, cold, snowy winters, and cool summers. Temperatures can drop below −20 °C with wind chill factors below −30 °C.

See also
List of mountain peaks of Alaska
Geology of Alaska

References

External links
 Pease Peak: Weather forecast
 Flight through 747 Pass: YouTube (Pease Peak inside propeller at 0:47 mark)

Alaska Range
Mountains of Matanuska-Susitna Borough, Alaska
Mountains of Denali National Park and Preserve
Mountains of Alaska
North American 2000 m summits